Kaberi Antardhan is a 2023 Indian Bengali language period romantic thriller film written and directed by Kaushik Ganguly. It is produced by Nispal Singh under the banner of Surinder Films. The film stars Srabanti Chatterjee and Prosenjit Chatterjee in lead roles. The story revolves around a crime and a love story at North Bengal during the Indian Emergency Period.

Cast 

 Srabanti Chatterjee as Kaberi Bhattacharya
 Prosenjit Chatterjee as Arghyakamal Sen
 Ambarish Bhattacharya as Amiyo Bhattacharya, Kaberi's husband
 Kaushik Ganguly as Detective Gokul Chandra Debnath
 Kaushik Sen as Mrinmoy Ghosh, Kaberi's brother
 Churni Ganguly as Nayantara Ghosh, Mrinmoy's wife
 Indraneil Sengupta as Inspector Pritam Singh
 Purab Seal Acharya as Amartya Ghosh, Mrinmoy's son

Release 
The official trailer was unveiled on 23 December 2022. The film was released  theatrically on 20 January 2023.

References